Joseph "Cannon Ball" Miller (birthdate unknown) was an American baseball pitcher in the pre-Negro leagues. His first known games were played for the Page Fence Giants.

Miller played a few seasons for Chicago teams Columbia Giants and Chicago Union Giants.

He played with many popular players of the day, including Sol White, William Binga, Rube Foster, Harry Hyde, Walter Ball, and Charles "Joe" Green.

References

External links

Brooklyn Royal Giants players
Columbia Giants players
Page Fence Giants players
Baseball pitchers
Adrian Reformers players